Homunculus Loxodontus (nicknamed Zhdun, "The One Who Waits", Snorp, or WOSH) is a statue by Dutch artist . It was made for the Leiden University Medical Center and installed in the spring of 2016. It became popular in post-Soviet countries where it is called Ждун (Russian for "one who waits").

Composition 
The sculpture depicts a legless, gray creature with the head of a Northern elephant seal, a larval body, and human arms clasped together in front of it. It sits on a waiting room chair, and, according to the sculptor, the figure symbolizes the emotions of people who wait at the doctor's office. The sculpture is made of plastic and epoxy resin, which, when mixed, form a clay-like substance that feels hard and rough to the touch.

History 
In May of 2016, the figure was installed in front of the children's hospital at the Leiden University Medical Center, but as of February 2017 is now displayed alongside other works of art inside the medical center. 

The Leiden University Medical Center originally awarded artist Margriet Van Brevoort a grant to create the sculpture for an annual art competition held by the Leiden Sculpture Foundation, where the sculptural theme for 2016 competition was biological sciences. Brevoort did not want to depict something related to the grim side of medicine or disease, and instead focused on the patients, ordinary people waiting to see a doctor for a diagnosis. According to her, the sculpture meant convey the message that "you should calmly wait for diagnosis with hope for the best", and was intended to look humorous, but also cute and huggable. 

In 2016, the sculpture was named the most photographed attraction in Leiden.

Internet meme 
In 2017 in Russia and a number of Eastern European countries the sculpture (renamed Zhdun, a fabricated noun version of the Russian verb zhdat''', which means "to wait") became an Internet meme, in which it is edited into famous paintings, photographs, videos, and other visual media. Models have been photographed in locales including an empty seat in the Ukrainian Parliament.

CD Land, a media company, bought the Russian media rights for five years starting in 2017.

The cover of the 2021 album Sand by Belgian indie pop-rock band Balthazar features Zhdun''.

See also 
 Stoned Fox

References

External links 
 Homunculus loxodontus on Margriet van Breevoort's website

2016 sculptures
Sculptures in the Netherlands
Leiden University
Russian Internet slang
Internet memes introduced from Russia
Internet memes introduced in 2017